Paper & Glue is a 2021 American documentary film, directed by JR. It follows JR's intention of giving a global voice to everyday people through art. Brian Grazer and Ron Howard serve as executive producers under their Imagine Documentaries banner.

It had its world premiere at the Tribeca Film Festival on June 19, 2021. It premiered on December 10, 2021, by MSNBC Films and Abramorama.

Synopsis
The film follows artist JR giving a global voice to everyday people through art.

Production
In April 2021, it was announced JR had directed and starred in a documentary film revolving around his art, with Ron Howard set to executive produce under his Imagine Documentaries banner, with Impact Partners, Artemis Rising Foundation, Shark Island Productions, Time Studio, Chicago Media Project producing.

Release
MSNBC Films acquired distribution rights to the film in June 2021. The Tribeca Film Festival hosted the world premiere of the film on June 19, 2021. It premiered on December 10, 2021.

References

External links
 

2021 films
2021 documentary films
American documentary films
Australian documentary films
French documentary films
Documentary films about photographers
Imagine Entertainment films
2020s English-language films
2020s American films
2020s Australian films
2020s French films